Ilustrado (from the Spanish word meaning "enlightened" or "erudite") is a 2014 Philippine television drama period series broadcast by GMA Network. Directed by King Mark Baco, it stars Alden Richards. The series is based on the life of Philippine hero José Rizal. It premiered on October 20, 2014 on the network's Telebabad line up replacing My Destiny. The show concluded on November 14, 2014 with a total of 20 episodes. It was replaced by More Than Words in its timeslot.

In March 2016, the series was released on DVD by GMA Records Home Video. The series is streaming on YouTube.

Premise
José Rizal needed to leave his family to fulfill his studies and career abroad, while also suffering from homesickness, and enduring a long-distance relationship with the woman he loved. He comes back home and uses the knowledge and skills he learned abroad to help improve the lives of his family and countrymen.

Cast and characters

Lead cast
 Alden Richards as José Rizal / Pepe

Supporting cast
 Kylie Padilla as Leonor Rivera 
 Eula Valdez as Teodora "Lolay" Alonso y Mercado
 Solenn Heussaff as Nellie Boustead
 Jaclyn Jose as Conchita Monteverde
 Ricardo Cepeda as Francisco Mercado
 Marco Alcaraz as Paciano Mercado
 Freddie Webb as Jose Alberto
 Polo Ravales as Venchito Monteverde
 Lito Legaspi as Padre Amado

Guest cast
 Jhiz Deocareza as young José Rizal
 Sean Ross as young Venchito Monteverde
 Max Collins as Consuelo "Suelo" Ortiga
 Wilma Olivar as Betang
 Junjun Quintana as Eduardo de Lete
 Angelina Kanapi as Teodora Formosa
 Raymond Alzona as Antonio
 Rhen Escaño as Isidra Monteverde
 Sue Prado as Saturnina
 Rolly Inocencio as Tiyago
 Silay Tan as Lina
 Elle Ramirez as Narcisa
 Lucho Ayala as José Alejandrino
 David Bianco as Charles Kipping
 Hazel Faith dela Cruz as Olimpia
 Marinela Sevidal as Carmen
 Vien King as Chengoy
 JC Tiuseco as Antonio Luna
 Mike Liwag as Marcelo H. del Pilar
 Carlo Cruz as Graciano López Jaena
 Jak Roberto as Máximo Viola
 Mark Bordalba as Félix Resurrección Hidalgo
 Charles Tongol as Dominador Gomez
 Cedrick Juan as Valentin Ventura
 Timothy dela Paz as Mariano Ponce
 Bryan Benedict as Juan Luna
 John Spainhour as Rubio Nicolas
 Sid Lucero as Andrés Bonifacio
 Glaiza de Castro as Gregoria de Jesus
 Benjamin Alves as Sebastian

Episodes

Accolades

References

External links
 
 

2014 Philippine television series debuts
2014 Philippine television series endings
Cultural depictions of Andrés Bonifacio
Cultural depictions of José Rizal
Filipino-language television shows
GMA Network drama series
GMA Integrated News and Public Affairs shows
Television series set in the 1860s
Television series set in the 1870s
Television series set in the 1880s
Television series set in the 1890s
Television shows set in the Philippines